Mustafa Raza Khan Qadri (1892–1981) was an Indian Sunni Muslim scholar and author, and leader of the Sunni Barelvi movement following the death of its founder, his father Ahmed Raza Khan.  He was known as Mufti-Azam-i-Hind to his followers.  In a biography compiled by Muhammad Afthab Cassim Razvi he is referred to as Mufti-e-Azam-e-Hind.

Lineage

Life
He wrote books on Islam in Arabic, Urdu, Persian, and announced judgments on several thousand Islamic problems in his compilation of fatawa Fatawa-e-Mustafwia. Thousands of Islamic scholars were counted as his spiritual successors. 
He was the main leader of the Jama'at Raza-e-Mustafa in Bareilly, which opposed the Shuddhi movement to convert Muslims to Hinduism in pre-Partition India. 
During the time of emergency in 1977 in India, he issued a fatwa against vasectomy which was made compulsory and 6.2 million Indian men were sterilized in just a year. In such circumstances Mustafa Raza Khan argued this order of Indian government given by Indira Gandhi.

Works
Raza Khan's books include:

Fatawa-e-Mustafawia 7Volumes (Religious rulings Mustafa Raza)
Al Malfoozat of Ala Hazrat (Sayings of Ahmed Raza Khan)
Saman-e-Bakhshish (Compilation of Islamic Poetry in the Honor of Prophet Muhammad)
Taqiya Baazi (Hidden Faces of Wahhabism)
Waqat-us-Sinan، Adkhal-us-Sinan، Qahr Wajid Diyan
Turq-ul-Huda Wal Irshad Ilaa Ahkam Al Amara Wal Jehad
Tasheeh Yaqeen Bar Khatm-e-Naiyeeen
Tardush Shaitan An Sabee Lur Rehman (Fatwa Refuting Government of Saudi Arabia For Imposing Tax on Pilgrims in 1365 A.H)
No Caste is Inferior

Disciples
His disciples include:
Muhammad Alawi al-Maliki
Sayed Muhammad Ameen  
Muhammad Mujeeb Ashraf
Mahmood Ahmad Razvi Quadri Ashrafi
Muhammad Idrees Raza Khan Qadri Razvi Hashmati
Mohammed Akhtar Raza Khan Azhari 
Qamaruzzaman Azmi
Muhammad Afzal Husain
Muhammad Husain
Rehan Raza Khan 
Tehseen Raza Khan 
Sayed Noor Muhammad
Zia Ul Mustafa
Abdul Hadi Qaadri 
Ahmad Muqaddam Qaadri
 Badrul Qaadri
Ghulam Sarwar Al Qaadri 
Mahmood Ahmad Qadri Rafaqati
Arshadul Qadri  
Muhammad Ibrahim Raza
Abdul Hamid Razvi 
Muhammad Ghufraan Siddiqi
Muhammad Muslehuddin Siddiqui
Sayed Shah Shah Turab-ul-Haq
Dr. Mufti Ghulam Sarwar Qadri
Badruddin Ahmed Qadri
Mufti Abdul Rashid Mufti e Azam Baraar
Mufti Mujeeb Ali

See also
Hamid Raza Khan
Jamaat Ahle Sunnat
Maulana Kaif Raza Khan

References

Bibliography
 
 

Indian Muslim scholars of Islam
Hanafis
Barelvis
People from Bareilly
Grand Muftis
1892 births
1981 deaths
Ahmed Raza Khan family
Indian people of Pashtun descent
Grand Muftis of India